"Suburban Train" / "Urban Train" is a double A-side single by DJ Tiësto, from his debut album In My Memory. "Suburban Train" was produced by DJ Tiësto and Kid Vicious (Ronald van Gelderen). The vocal version, titled "Urban Train", contains vocals by Kirsty Hawkshaw written by Kirsty and Tom Greenwood. The "Armin van Buuren Mash-Up" is known officially as "Yet Another Suburban Train" or simply "Another Suburban Train". The original single was released with remixes from German DJ Marc O'Tool, and English group Way Out West.

"Suburban Train" is heavily based on Ronald van Gelderen's track "Re-Form", which was released in 2000 under the alias Kid Vicious along with a remix by Tiësto.

Formats and track listings

CD, Maxi Singles
Netherlands Maxi Single
 "Suburban Train" (Radio Edit) - 3:26
 "Suburban Train" (Original) - 9:23
 "Suburban Train" (Way Out West Remix) - 8:48
 "Urban Train (Marc O'Tool Main Remix) - 9:01
 "Suburban Train" (Marc O'Tool Instrumental) - 8:58

Scandinavia Maxi Single
 "Suburban Train" (Original) - 10:27
 "Suburban Train" (Way Out West Remix) - 8:42
 "Urban Train" (Marc O'Tool Main Remix) - 9:02
 "Urban Train" (Marc O'Tool Dub Mix) - 8:06
 "Suburban Train" (Marc O'Tool Instrumental) - 9:02
 "Urban Train" (Radio Edit) - 3:01
 "Suburban Train" (Radio Edit) - 2:59

United States Maxi Single
 "Urban Train" (Marc O'Tool Radio Edit) - 2:58
 "Suburban Train" (Original Version) - 10:25
 "Suburban Train" (Way Out West Remix) - 8:50
 "Urban Train" (Marc O'Tool Main Mix) - 8:59
 "Urban Train" (Marc O'Tool Main Dub) - 8:04

United Kingdom Maxi Single
 "Urban Train" (Vocal Edit) - 3:00
 "Suburban Train" (Original Mix) - 9:16
 "Suburban Train" (Way Out West Remix) - 7:39

Germany
 "Urban Train" (Wippenberg Radio Edit) - 3:52
 "Urban Train" (Cosmic Gate Remix) - 7:44
 "Urban Train" (Wippenberg Remix) - 6:59
 "Urban Train" (Marc O'Tool Main Remix) - 8:59
 "Urban Train" (Marc O'Tool Dub Remix) - 8:02

12" Vinyl

Magik Muzik 12" Vinyl
 "Lethal Industry" –6:45
 "Suburban Train" –10:24

Magik Muzik 12" Vinyl
 "Suburban Train" (Original Mix) - 10:24
 "Suburban Train" (Way Out West Remix)–8:42
 "Urban Train" (Marc O'Tool Remix)–8:59
 "Suburban Train" (Marc O'Tool Instrumental)–9:01

Magik Muzik 12" Vinyl
 "Urban Train" (Cosmic Gate Remix)
 "Urban Train" (Wippenberg Dub Mix)

Magik Muzik 12" Vinyl
 "Suburban Train" (Radio Edit) - 3:26
 "Suburban Train" (Original) - 9:23

Nettwerk America 12" Vinyl
 "Suburban Train" (Original Version) - 10:25
 "Suburban Train" (Way Out West Remix) - 8:50
 "Suburban Train" (Marc O' Tool Main Mix) - 8:59

VC Recordings 12" Vinyl
 "Suburban Train" (Original Mix) - 10:25
 "Urban Train" (Marc O'Tool Dub) - 8:04

VC Recordings 12" Vinyl
 "Urban Train" (Vocal Edit) - 2:58
 "Urban Train" (Instrumental) - 2:58

VC Recordings 12" Vinyl
 "Suburban Train" (Way Out West Remix) - 8:50
 "Suburban Train" (Marc O'Tool Instrumental) - 9:00

Independence Records, Nebula 12" Vinyl
 "Suburban Train" (Original Mix) - 8:25
 "Urban Train" (Cosmic Gate Remix) - 7:44

Independence Records, Universal Licensing Music (ULM) 12" Vinyl
 "Suburban Train" (Original 12" Version) - 10:22
 "Suburban Train" (Marc O'Tool Instrumental) - 8:58

Dos Or Die Recordings 12" Vinyl
 "Urban Train" (Wippenberg Remix) - 6:59
 "Urban Train" (Cosmic Gate Remix) - 7:44

Urban Train/Flight 643

Dos Or Die Recordings 12" Vinyl
 "Urban Train" (Original Mix) - 9:20
 "Flight 643" (Original Mix) - 9:04

Dos Or Die Recordings 12" Vinyl
 "Suburban Train" (Marc O'Tool Main Remix)
 "Flight 643" (Oliver Klein Remix) - 9:27

Dos Or Die Recordings 12" Vinyl
 "Urban Train" (Radio Edit) - 3:24
 "Flight 643" (Radio Edit) - 2:52
 "Urban Train" (Original Mix) - 8:25
 "Flight 643" (Original Mix) - 6:18

Charts

Official versions
Suburban Train
 Armin van Buuren Mash-Up
 Radio Edit (3:25)
 Original Mix (10:27)
 Marc O'Tool Instrumental (8:58)
 Way Out West Remix (8:48)

Urban Train
 Cosmic Gate Remix (7:44)
 Instrumental (2:58)
 Marc O'Tool Dub (8:04)
 Marc O'Tool Main Remix (9:01)
 Vocal Edit (2:58)
 Wippenberg Remix (6:59)
 Wippenberg Radio Edit (3:52)

Release history

References

Tiësto songs
2001 songs
2001 singles
Songs written by Tiësto